Million Dollar Legs is a 1932 American pre-Code comedy film starring Jack Oakie and W.C. Fields, directed by Edward F. Cline, produced by Herman J. Mankiewicz (co-writer of Citizen Kane) and B.P. Schulberg, co-written by Joseph L. Mankiewicz, and released by Paramount Pictures. The film was inspired by the 1932 Summer Olympics, held in Los Angeles, California.

Plot
While visiting the mythical country of Klopstokia on business, brush salesman Migg Tweeny (Jack Oakie) collides with a young woman (Susan Fleming) on the street and the two fall instantly in love. Her name is Angela—all the women in Klopstokia are named Angela, and the men are named George—and she is the daughter of Klopstokia's president (W.C. Fields), whose country is bankrupt, and who relies upon his great physical strength to dominate a cabinet that is conspiring to overthrow him. Tweeny, hoping to win the hand of the president's daughter in marriage, presents him with a plan to remedy Klopstokia's financial woes: The president is to enter the 1932 Summer Olympics, win the weightlifting competition, and collect a large cash reward that has been offered to medalists by Tweeny's employer. Tweeny then sets out to find athletes to make up Klopstokia's Olympic team, and quickly discovers that the country abounds in athletes of exceptional abilities. The team, with Tweeny as their trainer, boards a steamship bound for America.

Meanwhile, the rebellious cabinet ministers, who are determined to sabotage Klopstokia's Olympic bid, have enlisted the services of "Mata Machree, the Woman No Man Can Resist" (Lyda Roberti), a Mata Hari-based spy character who sets out to destroy the Klopstokian team's morale by seducing each athlete and then setting them against each other in a collective brawl. Her efforts have the intended effect: When the team arrives in Los Angeles, it is in no condition to compete. After a pep talk from Tweeny fails to inspire them, Angela tracks down Mata, defeats her in an underwater fight, and forces a confession from her before the assembled team, which restores the athletes' fighting spirit. They take to the field and begin winning events.

By the time the weightlifting competition begins, Klopstokia needs only three more points for victory. In the film's final scene, Tweeny excites the president's fierce temper in order to inspire him to a final superhuman effort. The president throws a 1000-lb weight at Tweeny, missing him, but winning both the weightlifting competition and the shot put for Klopstokia.

Cast
 Jack Oakie as Migg Tweeny
 W.C. Fields as the President
 Andy Clyde as the Major-Domo
 Lyda Roberti as Mata Machree
 Susan Fleming as Angela
 Ben Turpin as Mysterious Man
 Hugh Herbert as Secretary of the Treasury
 Irving Bacon as Secretary of War (uncredited)
 George Barbier as Mr. Baldwin
 Dickie Moore as Willie - Angela's brother
 Ben Taggart as the Ship Captain (uncredited)
 Billy Gilbert as sneezing cabinet minister (uncredited)

Reviews
In 1932, The New York Times reviewer described the film as "a hopefully mad sort of picture ... where a series of comedians conducted themselves with a total lack of dignity."

After a June 2010 screening in Tribeca, The New Yorker writer David Denby described the film's odd, fragmented structure as well as its overall surreal tone:

Critic Pauline Kael named Million Dollar Legs as one of her favorite films, calling it a "lunatic musical satire".

References

External links
 
 
 
 
 

1932 films
1932 comedy films
American comedy films
American black-and-white films
Films directed by Edward F. Cline
Paramount Pictures films
Films set in Europe
Films set in a fictional country
Films about the 1932 Summer Olympics
Films with screenplays by Joseph L. Mankiewicz
Films produced by Herman J. Mankiewicz
Films produced by B. P. Schulberg
1930s English-language films
1930s American films